Charl Cilliers may refer to:

 Sarel Cilliers, or Charl Cilliers, Voortrekker
 Charl Cilliers (writer), writer
 Charl Cilliers, Mpumalanga, a town in South Africa